Elephant Rock was a rock formation at Hartlepool, England, shaped like an elephant which only existed for a few decades, being washed away by a storm in 1891.

It was created partially as a result of limestone quarrying of the sea cliff. A popular tourist attraction, it was painted in 1850 by J.S. Holmes and photographed by a team working for Francis Frith in 1886.

References 

Hartlepool
History of the Borough of Hartlepool
Limestone
Rock formations of England
1891 disestablishments in England